Elections to the Assam Legislative Assembly were held in February 1983 to elect members of 114 constituencies in Assam, India. The Indian National Congress won the popular vote and a majority of seats and Hiteswar Saikia was appointed as the Chief Minister of Assam. The number of constituencies was set as 126 by the recommendation of the Delimitation Commission of India.

Result

Elected members

See also
List of constituencies of the Assam Legislative Assembly
1983 elections in India

References

Assam
State Assembly elections in Assam
1980s in Assam